The 1864 United States presidential election in New Hampshire took place on November 8, 1864, as part of the 1864 United States presidential election. Voters chose five representatives, or electors to the Electoral College, who voted for president and vice president.

New Hampshire voted for the National Union candidate, Abraham Lincoln, over the Democratic candidate, George B. McClellan. Lincoln won the state by a margin of 5.12%.

Results

See also
 United States presidential elections in New Hampshire

References

New Hampshire
1864
1864 New Hampshire elections